Cedar Creek, located in southeast Iowa, USA, is a tributary of the Skunk River. Via the Skunk River it is part of the Mississippi River watershed. Cedar Creek rises in rural Mahaska County approximately one mile west of the unincorporated community of Cedar. It passes through Wapello, Jefferson, Van Buren, and Henry counties, passing by Fairfield before joining the Skunk River near the intersection of U.S. Route 34 and Clayton Avenue, about a half mile south of Rome.

Tributaries 
 (left) Wolf Creek
 (left) Berry Branch
 (right) Little Cedar Creek
 (left) Mud Creek
 (right) Rock Creek
 (right) Summer Creek
 (left) Rock Creek
 (left) Jones Branch
 (left) Troy Creek
 (left) Crow Creek
 (left) Mitchell Creek
 (left) Church Creek
 (right) Grubb Run
 (left) Hupp Creek
 (right) Bonell Creek
 (right) Rock Creek
 (left) Competine Creek
 (left) Coon Creek
 (left) Little Competine Creek
 (right) Honey Creek
 (right) Buckeye Creek
 (right) Jordan Creek
 (left) Wolf Creek
 (right) Little Cedar Creek
 (left) Spring Creek
 (left) Spring Branch

See also
List of rivers of Iowa

References

Rivers of Iowa
Rivers of Henry County, Iowa
Rivers of Jefferson County, Iowa
Rivers of Mahaska County, Iowa
Rivers of Van Buren County, Iowa
Rivers of Wapello County, Iowa